Lev Andreyevich Artsimovich (Russian: Лев Андреевич Арцимович, February 25, 1909 – March 1, 1973), also transliterated Arzimowitsch, was a Soviet physicist who is regarded as the one of the founder of Tokamak— a device that produces controlled thermonuclear fusion power.

Prior conceiving the idea on nuclear fusion, Artsimovich participated in the former Soviet program of nuclear weapons, and was a recipient of many former Soviet honors and awards.

Biography

Artsimovich was born on 25 February 1909 in Moscow in Russian Empire. His family had Polish nobility roots; nonetheless, he was described as Russian by his autobiographer in 1985. His grandfather, a professor, was exiled to Siberia after the Polish uprising against Tsarist Russia in 1863 and married a Russian woman, later settled in Smolensk. His father was educated in Lviv University; his mother, a pianist trained in Switzerland. In 1923, Soviet establishment moved the Artsimovich family (due to suspicion of Anti-bolshevist activity) to Minsk, where he found employment in Railroad industry there and started training towards becoming a railroad engineer. After his father found an employment in the Belarus State University, Artsimovich was able to attend the physics program at the Belarus State University, and graduated with a specialist degree in physics in 1928–29. After moving to Moscow, he found employment in Artem Alikhanian's laboratory, and joined the staff at the Ioffe Institute in 1930.

Initially, he worked on the problems relating to nuclear physics and unsuccessfully defended his thesis for Candidate of Sciences degree in 1937 and in 1939 at the Leningrad Polytechnical Institute, only receiving a written endorsement from the Ioffe Institute. Artsimovich, in his lifetime, was recommended by many leading Soviet physicists to be conferred with Doktor Nauk (a Russian PhD) but the recommendations were later dismissed.

In 1945, Artsimovich joined the Soviet program of nuclear weapons, working on electromagnetic method of Isotope separation of Uranium at the Laboratory No. 2 along with Isaak Pomeranchuk. He was given Russian espionage files by Soviet agencies on American Manhattan Project on electromagnetic method. But the Uranium enrichment under Artsimovich failed when it proved too costly since the electricity required for this work could not have produced by Soviet powergrid at that time. Despite being removed by Beria, Artsimovich continued work on gas discharges with the support from Kurchatov at his Laboratory No. 2, and after 1949, his work focused towards the field of nuclear fusion by producing the Lithium-6 for the RDS-6s device.

From 1951 to his death in 1973, Artsimovich was the head of the fusion power program in the former Soviet Union and invented the machine, for which he became to known as "the father of the Tokamak", a special concept for a fusion reactor. Once Artsimovich was asked when the first thermonuclear reactor would start its work. He replied: "When mankind needs it, maybe a short time before that."

In 1953, he became an academician of the Soviet Academy of Sciences and then member of its Presidium in 1957.  From 1963 to 1973, he was the vice-chairman of the Russian-chapter of Pugwash Committee and the chairman of the National Committee of Soviet Physicists. In 1966, he visited the United States to deliver lecture on fusion and Tokamak technology at the MIT, and was elected a Foreign Honorary Member of the American Academy of Arts and Sciences. On 1 March 1973, Artsimovich passed away due to cardiac arrest in Moscow, and the crater Artsimovich on the Moon is named after him.

Honours and awards
 1946 – Member of the Academy of Sciences of the Soviet Union
 1953 – Academician of the USSR
 1953 – Stalin Prize, first class
 1957 – Academician-secretary of the Department of General Physics and Astronomy, USSR Academy of Sciences, member of the Presidium of the USSR
 1958 – Lenin Prize
 1965 – Honorary Member of the Czechoslovak Academy of Sciences
 1966 – Foreign Honorary Member of the American Academy of Arts and Sciences
 1968 – Foreign Member of the Swedish Academy of Sciences
 1969 – Honorary Member of the Yugoslav Academy of Sciences
 1969 – Hero of Socialist Labour
 1970 – Honorary Citizen of Texas (USA)
 1971 – USSR State Prize
 1972 – Honorary Doctor of the University of Warsaw
 Four Orders of Lenin
 Two Orders of the Red Banner of Labour

See also
Russian Alsos

References

External links

Artsimovich's photo – from the Russian Academy of Sciences
  Artsimovich Memorial Lecture-OFES

1909 births
1973 deaths
Russian people of Polish descent
Belarusian State University alumni
Soviet physicists
Russian physicists
Soviet nuclear physicists
Scientists from Moscow
Fellows of the American Academy of Arts and Sciences
Full Members of the USSR Academy of Sciences
Members of the German Academy of Sciences at Berlin
Members of the Royal Swedish Academy of Sciences
Academic staff of the Moscow Institute of Physics and Technology
Academic staff of Saint Petersburg State University
Heroes of Socialist Labour
Stalin Prize winners
Lenin Prize winners
Recipients of the Order of Lenin
Recipients of the Order of the Red Banner of Labour
Recipients of the USSR State Prize
Soviet inventors
Burials at Novodevichy Cemetery
Foreign members of the Serbian Academy of Sciences and Arts